Tarhoncu Ahmed Pasha (died 21 March 1653) was an Ottoman Albanian statesman and Grand Vizier of the Ottoman Empire from 20 June 1652 until 21 March 1653, when he was executed because of the economic reforms he initiated.

Tarhoncu Ahmed Pasha was born in the area of modern Mat District, northern Albania in the early 17th century. He was initially a tarragon salesman (tarhoncu) before joining the Ottoman administration. He served as governor of Egypt before attaining the vezirate. During his brief tenure in the middle of the reign of Sultan Mehmet IV (r. 1648–1687), he attempted to forestall decline and reform the Ottoman bureaucracy. Tarhoncu Ahmed was the first grand vizier to draft an annual budget in advance of the coming fiscal year. However, his reforms threatened the conservative forces in the Ottoman elite, who secured his execution on 21 March 1653 by spreading the false rumour that he intended to depose the sultan. This effectively ended the attempts at reform for several years.

See also
 List of Ottoman Grand Viziers
 List of Ottoman governors of Egypt

References

 Stanford Jay Shaw, History of the Ottoman Empire and modern Turkey, vol. 1, Empire of the Gazis: The Rise and decline of the Ottoman Empire, 1280–1808 (Cambridge: Cambridge University Press, 1976), 205–206.

1653 deaths
17th-century Grand Viziers of the Ottoman Empire
17th-century Ottoman governors of Egypt
17th-century executions by the Ottoman Empire
Albanian Grand Viziers of the Ottoman Empire
Albanians from the Ottoman Empire
Devshirme
Executed people from the Ottoman Empire
People from Mat (municipality)
Executed Albanian people
Year of birth unknown
Ottoman governors of Egypt